Teo Kok Seong is a Malaysian politician who has served as Member of the Negeri Sembilan State Executive Council (EXCO) since May 2018 and Member of the Negeri Sembilan State Legislative Assembly (MLA) for Bahau since May 2018 and from March 2008 to May 2013. He joined the Democratic Action Party (DAP) in 2002 and subsequently became its youth chief. In March 2015, he was arrested for his involvement in the "Kita Lawan" rally. In 2008 he was elected to the Negeri Sembilan State Legislative Assembly for the seat of the Bahau and he won election to the federal parliament for the constituency of Rasah in 2013. In 2018 election he switched seat to Bahau and he defeated BN's candidate and PAS's candidate with a majority of 6109 votes.  He is currently the Member of Negeri Sembilan State Legislative Assembly of Bahau and also the Member of Negeri Sembilan State Executive Council, State Committee Chairman for Urban Wellbeing, Housing, Local Government & New Villages.

Election results

References

Members of the Dewan Rakyat
Members of the Negeri Sembilan State Legislative Assembly
Negeri Sembilan state executive councillors
Living people
Malaysian politicians of Chinese descent
Democratic Action Party (Malaysia) politicians
Year of birth uncertain
21st-century Malaysian politicians
1979 births